Philip Kan Gotanda (born December 17, 1951) is an American playwright and filmmaker and a third generation Japanese American. Much of his work deals with Asian American issues and experiences.

Biography 

Over the last three decades Gotanda has composed many plays designed to broaden theater in America. Through his plays and advocacy, he has been instrumental in bringing stories of Asians in the United States to mainstream American theater, as well as to Europe and Asia. The creator of one of the largest bodies of Asian American-themed work, Gotanda's plays and films are studied and performed at universities and schools across the USA.

Gotanda wrote the text and directed the production of Maestro Kent Nagano's Manzanar: An American Story, an original symphonic work with narration. His newest work, After the War, premiered at the American Conservatory Theater in March 2007. After the War chronicles San Francisco's Japantown in the late 1940s, when Japanese Americans returning from the internment camps encountered a flourishing African American jazz scene. A Japanese translation of his play, Sisters Matsumoto, opened in Tokyo with the Mingei Theatre Company.

Gotanda is also a respected independent filmmaker; his works are seen in film festivals around the world. His most recent film, Life Tastes Good, was originally presented at the Sundance Film Festival and can presently be seen on the Independent Film Channel. Along with executive producers Dale Minami and Diane Takei, he is currently developing his newest film, Inscrutable Grin, with their production company, Joe Ozu Films.

Gotanda holds a J.D. degree from Hastings College of the Law, studied pottery in Japan with the late Hiroshi Seto, and resides in Berkeley with his actress-producer wife Diane Takei. His play collections include No More Cherry Blossoms and Fish Soup and Other Plays, published by the University of Washington Press. Other published plays include The Wash, The Dream of Kitamura, Day Standing on its Head, Yohen, and The Wind Calls Mary.

Awards Gotanda has received include the Guggenheim, Pew Trust, 3 Rockefeller, Lila Wallace, National Endowment for the Arts, National Endowment for the Arts-Theater Communications Playwriting Award, A PEN Center West Award, LA Music Center Award, 2007 Japan Society of Northern California Award, A Chinese For Affirmative Action Award, NJHAS, City of Stockton Arts Award, East West Players' Visionary Award, Asian American Theater Company Life Time Achievement, 2 California Civil Liberties Public Education Program, 2009 MAP Fund Creative Exploration Grant, 2008 Granada Arts Theater Fellowship, UC Berkeley Arts Center Fellow in Theater, Sundance Theater Fellow, Sundance Film Fellow Program. Alongside Ed Bullins and Constance Congdon, Gotanda was announced as an inaugural recipient of the Legacy Playwrights Initiative Award in December 2020.

Career 
Gotanda, a leading American playwright and one of the most prolific playwrights in Asian American theatre. Theaters where Gotanda's works have been produced include  American Conservatory Theater, Berkeley Repertory Theatre, Campo Santo+Intersection, East West Players, Manhattan Theatre Club, Mark Taper Forum, Missouri Rep, New York Shakespeare Festival, Playwrights Horizons, Asian American Theater Company, Robey Theatre Company, San Jose Repertory Theatre, Seattle Repertory Theatre, and South Coast Repertory.

He has been Artist-in-Residence at Stanford University, University of California, Berkeley, and Berkeley Repertory Theatre.

Plays 
The Avocado Kid (musical)
Song For a Nisei Fisherman (play with songs)
"Bullet Headed Birds" (play with songs)
American Tattoo
The Wash
Yankee Dawg You Die
The Dream Of Kitamura
Fish Head Soup
Day Standing on Its Head
Yohen
"in the dominion of night"  (full-length spoken word play. Performed with the retro jazz ensemble, The New Orientals
The Wind Cries Mary
The Ballad of Yachiyo
Sisters Matsumoto
A Fist Of Roses (in collaboration with Campo Santo)
floating weeds
Manzanar: An American Story (original symphonic piece with spoken narrative text - librettist)
After The War (revised into "After The War Blues" in 2014)
Under The Rainbow (evening of two one acts:  Natalie Wood Is Dead; White Manifesto or Got Rice?)
#5 The Angry Red Drum
Child is Father to Man (short play presented by Silk Road Rising as part of "The DNA Trail")
Apricots of Andujar  (chamber opera - librettist)
The Life And Times of Chang and Eng - The Inescapable Truth Of Love That Binds
Love In American Times
Body Of Eyes (song cycle - lyricist)
The Jamaican Wash (Adaptation of The Wash with a Jamaican American Family)
#CAMPTULELAKE (short play commissioned by the Goethe-Institut as part of the Plurality of Privacy in Five-Minute Plays project and produced at A.C.T. in 2017)
Rashomon (Adaptation commissioned by Ubuntu Theater Project)
Pool of Unknown Wonders: Undertow of the Soul

Films 
The Wash (1988) — screenplay
The Kiss (1992 short) — director, screenplay, actor
Drinking Tea (short) — director, screenplay
Life Tastes Good (1999) — director, screenplay, actor
The Other Barrio (2015) — actor

See also 

List of Asian American writers
Japanese American internment

References

Critical studies 
As of March 2008:
From Ethnic to Mainstream Theater: Negotiating 'Asian American' in the Plays of Philip Kan Gotanda By: Dunbar, Ann-Marie; American Drama, 2005 Winter; 14 (1): 15-31.
Die Imaginierung ethnischer Weltsicht im neueren amerikanischen Drama By: Grabes, Herbert. IN: Schlote and Zenzinger, New Beginnings in Twentieth-Century Theatre and Drama: Essays in Honour of Armin Geraths. Trier, Germany: Wissenschaftlicher; 2003. pp. 327–44
Philip Kan Gotanda By: Randy Barbara Kaplan. IN: Liu, Asian American Playwrights: A Bio-Bibliographical Critical Sourcebook. Greenwood, 2002. 69-88.
Philip Kan Gotanda By: Maczynska, Magdalena. IN: Wheatley, Twentieth-Century American Dramatists, Fourth Series. Detroit, MI: Thomson Gale; 2002. pp. 116–27
Asian American Theatre History from the 1960s to 1990s: Actors, Playwrights, Communities, and Producers By: Kim, Esther Songie; Dissertation Abstracts International, Section A: The Humanities and Social Sciences, 2001 Feb; 61 (8): 2998-99. Ohio State U, 2000.
Yankee Dawg You Die by Philip Kan Gotanda By: Cho, Nancy. IN: Wong and Sumida, A Resource Guide to Asian American Literature. New York, NY: Modern Language Association of America; 2001. pp. 185–92
Philip Kan Gotanda By: Ito, Robert B.. IN: Cheung, Words Matter: Conversations with Asian American Writers. Honolulu, HI: U of Hawaii P, with UCLA Asian American Studies Center; 2000. 402 pp. pp. 173–85
Philip Kan Gotanda By: Hwang, David Henry; BOMB, 1998 Winter; 62: 20-26.
Choice and Chance By: Siegal, Nina; American Theatre, 1996 Feb; 13 (2): 26.
Fish Head Soup and Other Plays By: Omi, Michael. Seattle: U of Washington P; 1995.
David Henry Hwang's M. Butterfly and Philip Kan Gotanda's Yankee Dawg You Die: Repositioning Chinese American Marginality on the American Stage By: James S. Moy, Theatre Journal, Vol. 42, No. 1. (Mar., 1990), pp. 48–56.

External links

 
 www.philipkangotanda.com
 interview with Gotanda on www.hastings-i.org
profile on AsianWeek.com
 No More Cherry Blossoms: Sisters Matsumoto and Other Plays, University of Washington Press, 2005.

1951 births
Living people
American writers of Japanese descent
20th-century American dramatists and playwrights
American male dramatists and playwrights
American dramatists and playwrights of Japanese descent
American theatre directors of Japanese descent
American film directors of Japanese descent
Writers from San Francisco
University of California, Hastings College of the Law alumni
Film directors from San Francisco